is a Japanese manga series created by Zaurus Tokuda, originally serialized in Shogakukan's CoroCoro Comic magazine from December 1987 to March 1992. The story focuses on Yonkuro Hinomaru, a delinquent Mini 4WD enthusiast and member of a Mini 4WD racing team who tackles the world of miniature car racing. It is created as a tie-in to Tamiya's Mini 4WD franchise, and it is the first series to center on the franchise. An anime series based on the original manga was produced by Staff 21, Aubekku & Tokyu Agency and aired on TV Tokyo from October 3, 1989, to March 27, 1990. A sequel manga series, titled Hyper Dash! Yonkuro was created and illustrated by Hiroyuki Takei and began serialization on CoroCoro Aniki on March 14, 2015.

Plot
The story is a succession of races in fancy routes (pyramids, labyrinths, etc.) and tracks fit to make the cars race. During the series run, many characters will appear, like Momotaro (and his Mini 4WD, Crimson Glory, DashWarriors'last obstacle towards the final victory), Sabu Kinjiro (Aero Solitude) and also Jin that will race the Hell Rally with a new Mini4wd, the Proto Emperor ZX (the previous one was the Dash-X1 Proto Emperor, defeated in the regional finals by Yonkuro's then new mini4wd, the Dash-01 Super Emperor). The tracks become always more harder and the stories unlikely (in a volume of the manga, is mentioned that even the prehistoric children used mini4wd-like cars built with natural materials like wood and leaves that would be pushed by the wind), the story always will focus even more on which one would be the true "Emperor", it will be discovered are many mini4wds with this title that will confront against Yonkuro's Emperor, until the epilogue, in the epic challenge of the Hell Rally.

in this race Yonkuro will challenge a group of delinquents that want to take advantage of the best mini4wd racers to manage recovering a treasure hidden during the World War II by the nazis. Between his opponents there will be a revived Ken Hinomaru, ready to challenge the son and test his abilities with his new mini 4wd, the Dash-0 Infinite Boundless. In the end, Yonkuro, helped by his teammates (now far from racing, but always bound by a deep friendship), triumphs with his new car, the Liberty Emperor.

Characters

Main characters

Dash Warriors (Dash Corps)

He is the series' title main character and also the leader of the Dash!Warriors team. He is the boy with "the feather in the head" and his mini4wd is the Dash-1 Emperor.

Yonkuro is a mini4wd-enthusiast boy, Compared to his teammates, Yonkuro has a risky racestyle that aims to an overall efficiency in every route. His recklessness will bring always his mini4wd beyond the limits, to the point that he always will have the need to replace it due to the damages received and in order to compete with even more formidable opponents.

With such a dream in mind, Alan tries to become the best racer of the country and to convince many of his coetaneous that the Mini4wd cars are racing cars in miniature and not toys like most people believe.

Towards the end of the series, in the national races (seen only on the manga) he remains the only Dash Warriors' present and always active member. After leading the Dash Warriors to success in the final against Momotaro's team and their Crimson Glory, the las part of Dash!Yonkuro's story begins. Yonkuro finally will take part to the Hell Rally's last stage, the race that turn out the final goal: it was organised by delinquents that wanted to retrieve a treasure hidden by the nazis during the World War II, the Hell Rally is organised, so that the mysterious artefact, taking advantage from the best racers' abilities, in the vain attempt to discover the treasure's exact location. With the help of the other Dash Warriors, Yonkuro finally will manage to thwart the delinquents' plan and to win the race. At the end of the saga, Yonkuro will fulfill his dream of being a real scale car racer.

The name Yonkuro is a word pun: the word "Yonku" in Japanese means "four-wheel drive", while his Dash-1 Emperor is the result of a contest organised by Shogakukan, through which it was chosen the design of a new Mini4wD, that later, modified by the author, will become the ultimate model.

/

He is the Dash Warriors' second member and his mini4wd is the Dash-2 Burning Sun. Tankuro is a stout and very kind boy, even if at the beginning when he meets Yonkuro he seems a bit grumpy. His golden heart and his sacrifice spirit will reveal important to his team to access to the Mini4wd national tournament, despite his machine is not very fast. The quality and the style of Tankuro and his car are represented by the power of the car itself: increasing such power to the maximum at the expense of speed, the Dash-2 Burning Sun can be defined doubtlessly the most powerful and resistant car of the team. Shortly before the national finals, Tankuro will leave the team at the moment, realising of his opponents' strength and the not exaggerated confidence in him demonstrated by Yonkuro. He is seen again in the Momotaro team, the team that he should have faced in the finals, but his was not a betrayal: Tankuro, in fact took advantage of the situation to learn the use of the Front Motor chassis (F.M. Chassis) and to build Dash-2 Burning Sun's evolution, the Dash-02 Neo Burning Sun, a Mini4wd made even more powerful and innovative thanks to the then innovation of the front motor. During the last acts of the final race, in the attempt of crossing for first the finish line in the top of a building, he will use the condenser circuit of Pankuro's Dash-4 Cannonball, resulting in his mini4wd breaking into pieces after a few meters, but this sacrifice will be useful to Yonkuro, that thinks up an idea to win the race. At the end of the saga, during a reunion with the former teammates, all of them now grown up, he makes his last appearance.

The name Tankuro is a word pun with the word tank "Tank", referring to Tankuro's body mass and racing style. The word Tank even appears in the hood of the car.

The rich boy who lives in a coastal residence. Desiring the fact that he stands in apex of the Mini-4WD boundaries, he tries  to walk the road of loneliness, but fou running with in fight and interchange it awakes in friendship, participates in the dash corps. As for main machine "Dash-3 Shooting Star" of top speed concern. The extent which destroys condition in worry that the flat tire low/row with the unique close friend, he is not in the place of game. The Shin running being born, the parents divorced promptly, had lived with the mother and the older sister and 3 people, but in order to make the successor of the company of the father who remarries it came to the point of with being received in the south house. After that, it owed the scar of the cross to amount centering on the racing team of the older sister. The scar went out with operation, but when heart burns, like the south cruciform star it appears, it seems. There is a "southern cross express" the incompleteness as a shooting skill necessary. Also technology of remodelling was high, invented the stabilizer pole with improvisation. Shifting the counter gear, the body which accompanies shaft revolution twist it offsets and so on, it handles also complicated remodelling. With the black wind compilation, Mini 4WD, he runs to crisis.

/

Childhood friend of Shinkuro Minami. It has the guitar always with the flat tire make-up. The plain page two which is autonym the guitarist of the Led Zeppelin, the jitsu is thought also jimipeiji as the thing. In state of the element the soft unkind treatment it is dense with air weakness. It is not possible when it does not have the make-up, what to talk back and/or to resist. Changes to the rocker disposition whose is instantaneously wears the make-up personality strong. The machine uniting to be proud quickly, pace manufacturer part of the Shin. As for the main machine "Dash-4 The Cannonball" of acceleration force concern with, as for speed of start dash following of other things is not permitted. In addition, accumulating electricity, it lets flow to the motor, the "condenser circuit" is built in, but the application limit is the one time drill, furthermore after use you say that the machine itself causes large explosion, because "of the sword circuit of the blades" of hitting each other at the same time preparedness, to use, the preparedness which is suitable is needed. In the nationwide conference 2 game ninja [uoriazu] game, the machine which the offshoot is done was penetrated with travelling sound. In flat tire state the face is effective even in gang of hot-rodders of local end, as a name guitarist of the flat tire band which is formed with the family member is known. With the black wind compilation, Mini 4WD when it runs to crisis.

Younger sister of dash corps supervision and imperial fine fellow. Being strong, wisdom. Buffer agent part of the dash corps which adjusts inside the team. As a main machine, straight speed concern, it equips the fan in the fuselage rear surface and the inversion accident impossible machine "Dash-5 which acquires down fourth to friend dance (The Dancing Doll)" it has. At the beginning girl hair type such as twin tail and dumpling hair was many, but since trying it will be denounced the fact that it is the woman in race/lace in the reason, it will shave the hair with the cutter and probably to drop, it became many to make the long hair of straight. With the black wind compilation, Mini-4WD as it runs to crisis.

Secondary Characters

Older brother of Rinko. To be dash corps supervision, the real parent of all the dash series. He participate in Hell Rally as a navigator of the source 4WD, the scar of the face is the damage which it owes on midst of rally.

Which the Shinkuro Minami has raised secretly at the one claw shrine. Four running with it comes to the point of from time of game of the Shinkuro being raised by the imperial boat, becomes emblem existence of from now on dash corps.

Which it tries it will pick up the emperor whom source thickly 4WD lose, probably to recover that with you have a match from 4WD. It is defeated in four running, that calls it reaches the top "the older brother" in opportunity and the point where you yearn. The cartoonist who cannot be sold in neighborhood has lived, illustration of the wild mini- four running which that cartoonist designed was brought to the imperial origin. Those where it is designed on the basis of the illustration were the dinosaur, it had reached the point where unnoticed you use that as your own love car. It registers as supplementation of the dash corps from the mini- four running championship nationwide conferences. With Musashi, the dash warriors was supported. At the time of dash corps dispersion you exchanged the new sun and the dinosaur of the tank low/row, you participated in also the hell caravan being newly born one member of the dash corps.

Moby Dick, the son of the manager of the Pavilion of the city's fine dining Hazime Hutoshi. They are proud of the Mini 4WD off-road machine originally mini 4WD Use a white whale. Yonkuro was lost and only had 4x4 Mini Wairudomini to deepen exchanges thereafter. Register as a substitute for the dash from the Army National Tournament Championship Mini 4WD. National competition in the semifinals, unable to participate for reasons of poor maintenance Yonkuro's 4WD machine, the emperor played over borrowed.

Rival Team

U, U2

Team "U" director. Law and Qigong with superhuman physical abilities. Ichiro source drive, the broth of a boy have known the Emperor.

Leader of theTeam "U"  and Monk of the小輪寺超絶房（shō-rin-ji chō-zetsu-bou）. The team joined the army made a dash before the Sumeragi. Proto Emperor (原始皇帝)was the original machine that was used. Shoe says "demon." he apprenticed to a 博 (Po)　for seeking strongly body.　After the final qualification, the cooperation of the Corps who will dash. For training, that occasion in the past is to travel the country, meet Momotaro kido fake hospital incident.

Lost black wind, but realized the immaturity of his own into the training, Yonkuro,Genta and Momotaro vs Goro tactics anger in black like a black wind, drove Proto Emperor ZX(原始大帝) decide to join nascent army dash.

Team "U" member of the main temple chamber-eyed bunch of small wheels.

Team "U" member of the main bunch bunch of small-wheeled Hercules temple.

Team "U" member of the main bunch bunch of small-wheeled speedster temple. Known as "Sunflower". She always hiding their faces with bangs, are discovered and drive progress in the fight against Lang.

She has also participated in leading the women's team caravan.

Team "U" member of the chamber parallel to the main temple bunch of small circle. When the game is lost to Lang and 4WD small wheel in the temple. Something that the academy's training trip accompanied kido.

"U2" leader. Members call her "Princess" . Sister team.

"U2" member.

Momotaro Samurai Team

Okayama representative "Momotaro Samurai" team leader. Furontomiddoshippumashin Crimson placed in front of the chassis motor G is used. Hall Institute of friendship with the demons have a real hospital case fake demon temple. A dash to join a nascent army as hell, and the defeat of black wind, the feeling that the dog will bite time is increasing steadily not deny the appearance of sand cloth.

Okayama representative "Momotaro Samurai" team members. The original racer together plain area, the goal was to represent the district when the team was invited to put a representative in the race lost the Peach Boy, Momotaro Samurai joined the team since.

{{Nihongo|Kiziro Okuyama|奥山 喜次郎|Okuyama Kizirō}}

Okayama representative "Momotaro Samurai" team members. The original racer together mountainous area, the area was to be represented, when the team was invited to put a representative in the race lost the Peach Boy, Momotaro Samurai joined the team since. When there is a vacancy in the gears of the machine Momotaro National Convention, destroying their machines, Momotaro committed to victory.

Okayama representative "Momotaro Samurai" team members. The original racer together Konno village, district representatives had hoped, when the team was invited to put a representative in the race lost to Momotaro, Momotaro Samurai joined the team since.

Okayama representative "Momotaro Samurai" team coach. Momotaro's grandfather. Kurimuzonshirizu made drawings based on written sources Yonkuro Hinomaru drive.

Mini 4WD Championship Participants

"Herusu Kids" ace in the captain. Whether there twice in the bulk mate, fair play like.
Hell has also participated in leading a team caravan.

"Herusu Kids" members. The first round of races and two army dash.

"Herusu Kids" members. The first round of races and two army dash.

"Herusu Kids" members. Daido Cup race with a second round of the second dash and corps.

"Herusu Kids" members. Daido Cup races with the second round and third dash corps.

"Herusu Kids Health" alternate, substitute with any other team in the championship, "Desuparedo" play for. The participants played a game with Ichiro that Yonkuro, kids lost in the first round health.

 (one-edged splitting)

A team consisting of five children, "Brothers planets" members. Dash Warriors and participated in by qualifying in the area are also a national tournament quarterfinals. Dash Corps hear us, to check one's RC is to challenge, and lose out by Yonkuro  wit.Mike"Jet team" members. Ability to participate in the qualifying semi-final is less glamorous areas. Hall Institute, led by U semifinals defeated demon.

Osaka, western representative "Yoshimoto" team leader. In the Kansai region famous "Yoshimoto pop." Lang was a game and in cases of Urusena 4WD. Tuning is called God, and afflicted the national tournament quarterfinals dash Corps exact machine on stage decorated with a distinctive remodeling.

 Akita representative "phantom" team leader. The name was listed as a potential winner can not end the story involved.

Tokyo Representative East "Heavy Metal Army (Warriors)" leader. The name was listed as a potential winner, the Dash Corps and participated in the semifinal only three substitute emperor.

Mie representative "Ninja Warrior" leader. The team joined the army before the Emperor made a dash, use a shadow emperor. After we had learned the art of invisibility team went to the MIE. To defeat that one difference between the bumper to match against the second half track down a legion in the first half dash advantage of ninja tactics. After the game, things are said to participate in national competition three emperors.

Tokyo Representative East "Heavy Metal Army (Warriors)" in the alternate, a true leader. Has joined the team before the imperial army made a dash, use the sacred emperor. One of the three emperors. Lang's clever scheme to defeat before fighting their way back the 4WD can overwhelm the performance and how to fight with Goro 4WD machine.

Tokyo Representative East "Heavy Metal Army (Warriors)" in the alternate, three emperors. Has joined the team before the imperial army made a dash, use the Wind God Emperor.

Tokyo Representative East "Heavy Metal Army (Warriors)" in the alternate, three emperors. The team joined the army before the Emperor made a dash, use the magic emperor.

Black Wind Chapter

The mysterious boy Crimson Solitude Furontomiddoshippumashin using different strains. Crimson Solitude The G was created based on the drawings left by Ichiro Furontomiddoshippumashin drive as the source. Oni said Hall Institute "If you join a team national tournament if he was told absolutely winning." Appearance and name of the Moomin and the Snufkin that the motif. But in the  Sakuchū Kinji Ichiro, field book about the characters are written "欽次 - Qīn cì". The help of a man in black later clarified the portion of the drawing Furontomiddoshippumashin black filled, Earosorichudo to complete. Part filled black is said to set retrofit written by "waste of the same principle-driven injection oil" had been explained, in the play it decreases the driving force difference between driving and jet oil was no .

Black style leader. Use black wind 2WD. Yonkuro's after losing a battle with 4WD is effectively expelled from the black wind, and to present a united front after Yonkuro.Shimabukuro;

Captain of the team in Okinawa area. Use the mini-submarine and 4WD Nunchaku-stick Okinawa Karate style. After losing to the Yonkuro's gale winds will be a black leader.ElderBlack elder style. The rally participants from hell, after a dead heat source in the car and driven underground Lang Island, Orochi, meets with an accident suffered serious injury. Created a blueprint for the black wind driven sources Yonkuro.

Other Characters
 (re-take initially atomic Maru The fire)

Father of Yonkuro. Racer. Horizon owners. The modifications to Supaenpera broth of a boy received from Imperial, Guretoenpera created. During the rally hell, which is missing. In the Amazon in South America, as has been said that God helped the girls division of the lake. Six feet loincloth wore. May have escaped from the crisis instead of a loincloth rope.

Infrared remote control at the horizon (acceleration and deceleration, steering), including features, has a very high technology. The name and car number on the horizon instead of drive Ichiro named by sources, is only to be told in Sakuchū on their own, called Imperial.

Hell during the rally, after a dead heat in the basement of the Island, Orochi, now meets with an accident amnesia. Then he spent months quietly in the basement of the island Orochi.Jackie "Jack" SakataPeople come to bring the army under the dash horizon. In delivering the horizon, was intended to convey a safe source driven Yonkuro, brought the race to know with infrared remote control capabilities to the horizon, and legion unexpected dash to struggle will be imposed. Lang looks exactly like the source drive to the appearance of unkempt long hair and side whiskers, 4x4 Ichiro had me confused with my father delivered horizon.

Yonkuro's grandmother. The animation was also serving as a cheerleader in support.

To: four wheel drive mini race commentary charge. Tamiya belongs publicity department (then) known as the "before her" and modeled on Mr. Maeda Yasuyuki with this, but a mole in the same position as himself, and glasses instead of sunglasses.

The Japanese Mini 4WD Association president, was a trial run at the national competition championship ceremony. Mini 4WD Association president yet, "switch it somewhere?" Remarks that person.

Live announcer in charge of Mini 4WD championship.

House butler south.

Jiro's sister drive progress. After her parents divorced, lived with his mother and three in custody until the drive home Yonkuro progress south. The team is participating in Sazankurosukantori.CaptainCaptain of the whole conditional clauses are scum. And fighting against piracy, but to tell the tale of triumph and escape from the tomb of the boat and, truth is not clear.

Place the caravan hell "Orochi Island," took to the nascent army dash.

 (Ōrudomango Kiburi)

Yopparai that roost on the site of District agencies. The former engineer, now disused C62 has been developed as a treasure.

After starting the scrap shop.Urusena IretonF-1 drivers. Italian GP was the continued slump since the accident, and four polished look of a desperate struggle to remember F1 Spirit Yonkuro. The model, of course, be responsible for triggering a boom in F1 at the time Ayrton Senna.IppeiArmy camp using the dash, the son of a certain hot springs spa town. God's plan to boost the swamp.SidBoy living in the Amazon in South America. Divine says, with a horizon-like machine.HereGirls living in the Amazon in South America. Divine says, with a horizon-like machine.S.The boy was carried into the hospital tank is low. Radio call sign, "Yonkuro." The first race was held on the Stars and surgeries, the Kabuki dance played in the chassis and body is S. Lang upstream 4WD.

Satoshi wireless fellow truck driver.C · TLarry Lang companion source drive. Mini 4WD is also a friend.AnastasiaC · T in childhood, and nuns. Accused of being witches.Xena IretonBrazilian RC · F1 racer. Poor, there are two brothers and one sister.Alejandro Jose'''

RC · F1 Championship in Brazil. Xena tried to buy.

The cartoonist living in the downtown area sell, the appearance of a potted flower head. Zaurus Tokuda identity of the creator of the work is saying. And the familiar face Genta. Zaurus is a sketch based on imperial "Wild Zaurus" were fabricated.

 (Agoyama)

Mini 4WD Team "Hirusu Kids" representative director. Yonkuro says 4WD, Agogorira.

Media
Manga
The manga was written and illustrated by Zaurus Tokuda, serialized in the monthly CoroCoro Comic from December 1987 until March 1992, compiling it into 14 Tankobon volumes. Several spinoff stories revolving the series were released before its successor series was serialized. This, alongside Bakusō Kyōdai Let's & Go!! contributed on the popularity of Tamiya's Mini 4WD franchise in Japan and overseas. Despite the author's death, a sequel manga series, titled  was created by Hiroyuki Takei (under Tokuda's family approval) and began serialization in CoroCoro Aniki magazine on March 14, 2015 and ending in March 15, 2021. 4 Tankobon Volumes were released in Japan.

Anime
An anime adaptation of the original manga was produced by Staff 21, Aubekku & Tokyu Agency and aired on TV Tokyo from October 3, 1989, to March 27, 1990, replacing Mister Ajikko in its original timeslot. The series was directed by Hitoshi Nanba and written by Takashi Yamada (Ojamajo Doremi, Jewelpet, HeartCatch PreCure). The opening song is titled "Be Top" by Taku Kitahara while the ending theme is titled  by Taku Kitahara.

Merchandise
Merchandise of the series were released by Tamiya under the Mini 4WD line of race car models.

Reception
Hiroyuki Takei, author of Shaman King and later Hyper Dash! Yonkuro cited he once submitted a design on a contest held by Shogakukan during his middle school years. Despite not be used for Yonkuro's machine, it became the basis for the Dash-3 Shooting Star. The one-shot autobiography manga Dear Zaurus Tokuda'' was based on Takei's story.

References

External links
 

1989 anime television series debuts
Animated television series about auto racing
Children's manga
CoroCoro Comic
Japanese children's animated sports television series
Motorsports in anime and manga
Seinen manga
TV Tokyo original programming
Tamiya Corporation